Mckenna Grace (born June 25, 2006) is an American actress. She began acting professionally at the age of four, with her earliest roles including Jasmine Bernstein in the Disney XD sitcom Crash & Bernstein (2012–2014) and Faith Newman in the soap opera The Young and the Restless (2013–2015). In 2018 and 2019, The Hollywood Reporter named her one of the top 30 stars under age 18. She is known for her roles as Mary Adler in the 2017 film Gifted, Abigail Stone in the 2021 film Spirit Untamed, Phoebe Spengler in the 2021 film Ghostbusters: Afterlife, and Esther Keyes in Hulu's adaptation of Margaret Atwood's The Handmaid's Tale. For her performance in the fourth season, she received a Primetime Emmy nomination for Outstanding Guest Actress in a Drama Series, becoming the first child nominated in the Guest category and 10th youngest individual acting nominee across all categories.

Career

Acting
In 2013, Grace made her acting debut playing Sydney in the television pilot Joe, Joe & Jane. Later she recurred on the Disney XD series Crash & Bernstein. She had a recurring role as Faith Newman on The Young and the Restless between 2013 and 2015. In 2015, she had a recurring role on the CBS series CSI: Cyber. Grace played the role of Daisy in the science fiction thriller Independence Day: Resurgence; the film, directed by Roland Emmerich, was released on June 24, 2016. Other early film roles include the drama film Mr. Church (2016), and the comedy film How to Be a Latin Lover (2017).

In 2017, Grace played a lead role in the Marc Webb drama film Gifted as child prodigy Mary Adler, starring alongside Chris Evans. She gained recognition for her performance in the role, being nominated for the Critics' Choice Movie Award for Best Young Performer.

She learned to ice skate to portray the younger version of Tonya Harding in the biopic I, Tonya, describing it as the "most challenging role" she'd ever undertaken. Grace also played the significant role of Juliet in the horror film Amityville: The Awakening along with Bella Thorne; Franck Khalfoun directed the film.

Grace starred as Emma Grossman in the 2018 horror drama film The Bad Seed.

Grace has occasionally appeared in Young Sheldon from 2018 to 2021 as Paige Swanson, a child prodigy and a rival to Sheldon Cooper.

Grace starred as Judy Warren, daughter of paranormal investigators Ed and Lorraine Warren, in the 2019 horror film Annabelle Comes Home. Also that year, she appeared in the Marvel Studios film Captain Marvel as a younger version of the titular character.

Grace appeared as the younger version of Sabrina Spellman on the first season of Netflix's Chilling Adventures of Sabrina.

She voiced the younger Daphne Blake in the 2020 animated film Scoob!, and was set to reprise the role in the follow-up Scoob!: Holiday Haunt, which was set for release in late 2022 on HBO Max, but it was canceled in August 2022.

In 2021, she starred in Universal Pictures animated film, Spirit Untamed as Abigail Stone.

Grace's career has encompassed portraying the "younger version" of various characters. On this notion she stated, "It's really funny. I don't know how that ended up happening. But I'm really glad that it did, because I definitely got to learn from all of the actresses that I played younger versions of."

In 2021, Grace played Phoebe in Ghostbusters: Afterlife and began playing the recurring role of Esther Keyes in the fourth season of the Hulu adaptation of Margaret Atwood's The Handmaid's Tale, and earned a nomination for Outstanding Guest Actress in a Drama Series at the 73rd Primetime Creative Arts Emmy Awards. In August, she joined Thomasin McKenzie and Olivia Wilde in Searchlight Pictures' feature Perfect.

Music
In 2020, Grace signed with Photo Finish Records, and in November 2021 she released her debut single "Haunted House" alongside an accompanying music video. While not originally written for Ghostbusters: Afterlife, the song was eventually added to the film's soundtrack and used for the closing credits. When asked, Grace explained that the song was written during a rough period of her life in the midst of the COVID-19 pandemic, and that one "could take it as a breakup song, but it could also be about a friend or a family member or any kind of relationship that's ended."

On February 13, 2022, Grace released her follow up single "Do All My Friends Hate Me?" along with a music video. On April 21, Grace released her third single "You Ruined Nirvana", also with a music video. On July 8, Grace released her fourth single "Post Party Trauma", but with a lyric video instead.  On November 18, 2022, Grace released her fifth single “Self Dysmorphia”, with the lyric video filmed by Grace, who was confined to her chair, after surgery to correct her scoliosis. On January 6, 2023, Grace released her sixth single "Ugly Crier" about her anxiety and the feelings of inadequacy, which she also explored in "Do all my friends hate me?". Both songs reference a voice in her head telling her negative things about her worth.  In March 2023, she released her first record, the EP Bittersweet 16, pulled by the music video Buzzkill Baby.

Personal life
Grace is a vegetarian and has directed her affection for animals towards work with Farm Sanctuary and PETA, including appearing in a campaign reminding people not to leave their dogs in hot cars. She is of Mexican descent.
 
She was diagnosed with scoliosis at age 12, and on October 9th, 2022, she underwent spinal surgery to correct the curvature of her spine, which was over 45 degrees. Post-op, her spinal curvature is at only 6 degrees.

Filmography

Film

Television

Music videos

Discography

EPs
• Bittersweet 16 (2023)

Singles

Awards and nominations

References

External links

 
 
 
 

2006 births
21st-century American actresses
21st-century American singers
American child actresses
American child singers
American film actresses
American television actresses
American voice actresses
American pop rock singers
American musicians of Mexican descent
Child pop musicians
Living people
Singer-songwriters from Texas
Actresses from Texas
American actresses of Mexican descent